Copper(I) bromide is the chemical compound with the formula CuBr.  This diamagnetic solid adopts a polymeric structure akin to that for zinc sulfide.  The compound is widely used in the synthesis of organic compounds and as a lasing medium in copper bromide lasers.

Preparation, basic properties, structure
The compound is white, although samples are often colored due to the presence of copper(II) impurities. The copper(I) ion also oxidizes easily in air. It is commonly prepared by the reduction of cupric salts with sulfite in the presence of bromide. For example, the reduction of copper(II) bromide with sulfite yields copper(I) bromide and hydrogen bromide:

2 CuBr2  +  H2O  +    →  2 CuBr  +    +  2 HBr

CuBr is insoluble in most solvents due to its polymeric structure, which features four-coordinated, tetrahedral Cu centers interconnected by bromide ligands (ZnS structure).  Upon treatment with Lewis bases, CuBr converts to molecular adducts.  For example, with dimethyl sulfide, the colorless complex is formed:
CuBr  +  S(CH3)2  →  CuBr(S(CH3)2)
In this coordination complex, the copper is two-coordinate, with a linear geometry.  Other soft ligands afford related complexes.  For example, triphenylphosphine gives CuBr(P(C6H5)3), although this species has a more complex structure.
Thermal excitation of copper(I) bromide vapour yields a blue-violet emission which is of greater saturation than known copper(I) chloride emission. Copper(I) bromide is hence an advantageous emitter in pyrotechnic flames.

Applications in organic chemistry
In the Sandmeyer reaction, CuBr is employed to convert diazonium salts into the corresponding aryl bromides:
 + CuBr → ArBr + N2 + Cu+
The aforementioned complex CuBr(S(CH3)2) is widely used to generate organocopper reagents. Related CuBr complexes are catalysts for atom transfer radical polymerization and copper-catalyzed cross-dehydrogenative couplings (CDC).

References

External links

Web Elements

Bromides
Metal halides
Copper(I) compounds
Zincblende crystal structure